Thiruporur is a panchayat town in Chengalpattu district, Tamil Nadu, India.

Thiruporur may also refer to:
 Tirupporur (state assembly constituency)
 Thiruporur taluk

See also
 Thiruporur Kandaswamy temple